is a passenger railway station located in the city of Asago, Hyōgo Prefecture, Japan, operated by West Japan Railway Company (JR West). The name Aokura come from Aokura shrine that is about 5 kilometers east of the station and is known as the "God of Eyes" in Japan.

Lines

Station layout
The station consists of one ground-level side platform serving a single bi-directional track. The station is unattended.

Adjacent stations

History
Aokura Station opened on August 10, 1934. With the privatization of the Japan National Railways (JNR) on April 1, 1987, the station came under the aegis of the West Japan Railway Company.

Passenger statistics
In fiscal 2016, the station was used by an average of 52 passengers daily

Surrounding area
Aokura Shrine

See also
List of railway stations in Japan

References

External links

 Station Official Site

Railway stations in Hyōgo Prefecture
Railway stations in Japan opened in 1934
Asago, Hyōgo